The Denton House is a historic building in New Hyde Park, New York, within the Town of North Hempstead. Built in 1795 as a farmhouse, it was converted in the 1860s to a Georgian-style mansion. It is currently a McDonald's restaurant.

History
The building was built as a farmhouse for the family of Joseph Denton in 1795. The owners were descendants of Richard Denton, a Presbyterian minister who immigrated in 1630 and a founder of the town, and his son, colonist Daniel Denton. In the 1860s, it was converted into a Georgian-style mansion, with ornamentation.

The house ceased being a private residence after World War I, at which point it became a funeral home  and then a series of restaurants.

McDonald's acquired the dilapidated property in 1985, intending to demolish it and build a standard structure. North Hempstead and residents of the New Hyde Park community successfully sought historic designation after a three-year battle, which was formally given on January 5, 1988. An agreement was reached with McDonald's to allow a single-story addition to the back for a drive-thru if the front exterior was restored to its 1926 appearance. After an extensive renovation which included installing a series of windows for the veranda, and restoration of the ornamentation, window shutters, and brick chimneys, McDonald's opened in the historic building on April 13, 1991. A plaque commemorating the opening can be found inside the dining room. The inside was gutted in the process, including exposed rafters. A grand staircase leads to a dining area on the second floor.

As part of McDonald's company-wide renovation program, the Denton House received another renovation in 2017. Carefully planned and executed to conform with McDonald's design standards while still maintaining a historic look, the renovation refinished the interior woodwork and flooring, updated the restrooms, and added amenities consistent with McDonald's remodels, including digital menu boards, touchscreen ordering kiosks, and table service. The window shutters and front doors were also restored and repainted black.

Gallery

References

External links

 

Houses completed in 1795
Town of North Hempstead, New York
Houses in Nassau County, New York
McDonald's buildings and structures
Restaurants established in 1985
1985 establishments in New York (state)
Restaurants in New York (state)